"Rosas" is a song by Filipino singer-songwriter Nica del Rosario and theater actress Gab Pangilinan. It was written and produced by del Rosario and Rap Sanchez and was released on March 4, 2022, through FlipMusic Records. The song was a tribute to 2022 Philippine presidential election candidate, former Vice President Leni Robredo.

Background 
Prior to "Rosas", del Rosario also recorded and released a campaign jingle, "Kay Leni Tayo" featuring Jeli Mateo and her then-girlfriend (her wife now) Justine Peña on August 17, 2021, two months before the filing of the certificate of candidacy for President of Leni Robredo. While "Kay Leni Tayo" was fast, young, and incorporates rap melodies, "Rosas" was a much slower, and more heartfelt song. The song features theater actress Gab Pangilinan, who was also the niece of the vice-presidential candidate and Robredo's running-mate, former senator Francis "Kiko" Pangilinan. Del Rosario described the song as the "imagined point-of-view of Vice President Leni Robredo... what she would like to say to the people of this nation [Filipinos]". It was also inspired by Sara Bareilles-penned song, "Seriously", performed by Leslie Odom, Jr., taking the point-of-view of Barack Obama.

Composition 
"Rosas" is a pop, OPM, and political song performed in the key of D♯/E♭ Major using  time with a tempo of 150 beats per minute.

Music video 
The official audio of "Rosas" was released on March 4, 2022, at a length of four minutes and thirty-three seconds, and the lyric video was released on March 19, 2022.

The music video premiered on April 22, 2022, a day before Robredo's birthday and was directed by Treb Monteras. Several number of women ranging from actresses, vloggers, activists, models and singers appeared in the video, including Gabby Padilla, Yana Kalaw, Levina Alabanza, Leanne & Naara, Natasha Kintanar, Janina Gacosta, Robredo's daughters Aika and Tricia Robredo, Wynona Galvez, Gretchen Laurel, Zsaris, Saab Magalona, Jennycha Victorio, Janina Vela, Chai Fonacier, Mia Reyes, Ayn Bernos, Madelene de Borja, Gelyn Rosillo, Tippy Dos Santos, Cha Roque, Ma Line Nalangan, Ymi Sy, May Alabanza, Mela Habijan, Kelsey Hadjirul, Ceej Tantengco, Pangilinan's niece Hannah Pangilinan, Mitzi Sumilang, Alex Castro, Ana Patricia "Patreng" Non, Save San Roque Alliance and Bing Domantay. This music video was made possible through the efforts of Film Workers for Leni, FlipMusic Records, and all volunteers and supporters of Leni Robredo.

As of October 2022, the music video has more than two million views on YouTube.

Live performances and other versions

Rallies 
On March 20, 2022, del Rosario and Pangilinan performed at F. Ortigas Jr. Road (Emerald Avenue) in Pasig City for the grand rally, dubbed as "PasigLaban". 
On April 5, 2023, del Rosario and Pangilinan performed at Rizal Capitol Grounds in Antipolo, Rizal for People's Rally.
On April 23, 2022, del Rosario and Pangilinan, together with Bukas Palad Music Ministry performed their hit new version at Pasay City for the celebration of Robredo's 57th birthday, dubbed as "Araw Na10 'To! H2H Day at People's Rally para sa Kaarawan ni VP Leni Robredo" which was attended by more than 400,000 people. 
On May 7, 2022, del Rosario performed at Ayala Avenue in Makati City with Filipino comedian and It's Showtime host Vice Ganda during the Angat Buhay Pilipino Miting De Avance. It also performed by Baay, Linao, Burdeos, Lumanlan and Ramos for their new rock version, a day after release.

Rock version 
On May 7, 2022, FlipMusic Records released a rock version of its popular campaign song performed by Maysh Baay of Moonstar88, Jomal Linao and Allan Burdeos of Kamikazee, Ariel Lumanlan of Chelsea Alley/Arcadia, and Carissa Ramos of Catfight.

Stages 
On June 6, 2022, del Rosario and Pangilinan, together with Matthew Chang performed their extended version at The 70's Bistro.
On September 30, 2022, del Rosario performed her acoustic version of extended version at Stage Session.
On November 11, 2022, del Rosario and Pangilinan performed at Arlington Memorial Chapels using their extended version.

Extended version 

On May 10, 2022, del Rosario posted on Twitter the new additional verses and snippets for "Rosas", which was eventually called the "extended version", after partial, unofficial results showed Robredo's opponent, Bongbong Marcos leading by a wide margin. The words were inspired by Robredo's speech, where she expressed gratitude to supporters, assured volunteers that their efforts have not been in vain, and called them on to continue the fight beyond the elections.

On May 14, 2022, five days after the election, del Rosario and Pangilinan, together with violinist Matthew Chang, performed the extended version on a thanksgiving event, dubbed as "Tayo ang Liwanag: Isang Pasasalamat", at Ateneo de Manila University Campus Grounds in Quezon City.

It was released on June 3, 2022, across all streaming platforms, and features Gab Pangilinan, violinist Matthew Chang and Tinig Tumintindig Grand Choir.

Notable cover versions 
 On 8 May 2022, Julie Anne San Jose posted a short acoustic rendition of the song on her Twitter account.

Chart performance 
"Rosas" debuts at number twenty-one on Billboard Hits of the World (Philippines Songs) chart on the week dated May 14, 2022. It eventually skyrocketed and peaked at number two the following week, behind anees' "Sun and Moon". It also topped local iTunes and Apple Music charts. On Spotify Philippines daily chart, "Rosas" rises to number-one on the election day (May 9, 2022) with 372,499 local streams, becoming the first all-female duet by OPM artists number-one song on the said chart. It remains at number-one, the following day, with an increased 403,997 local streams. "Rosas" became the first number-one song by an OPM female artist since Moira Dela Torre's featured role on Ben&Ben's 2021 song "Pasalubong" and the first number-one song by an OPM female lead artist since Dela Torre's "Paubaya" (2020). With the notable performance of "Rosas" on Spotify, Nica del Rosario became the first OPM female artist to reach the top ten of the Spotify Philippines Daily Top Artists chart. At that time, Del Rosario and Gab Pangilinan has joined Dela Torre as the only OPM female artist to reach number-one on Spotify Philippines chart.

It also reached number-one on the Philippines and global Spotify Viral charts.

Track listings 
Digital download
"Rosas" – 4:33

Digital download – Extended Version
"Rosas" – 5:17

Digital download – Brian Cua Dance Remix
"Rosas" (Brian Cua Dance Remix) – 4:16

Digital download – Toy Armada Orchestral Tribute
"Rosas" (Toy Armada Orchestral Tribute) – 4:28

Personnel 
Credits adapted from YouTube.
 Gianina Camille "Nica" del Rosario – vocal, guitarist, composer
 Gab Pangilinan – vocal
 Matthew Chang – violin
 Rap Sanchez – mixed, mastered
 Jeralph Sanchez – composer

Charts

Awards and nominations

See also 
 Leni Robredo 2022 presidential campaign

References 

2022 songs
2022 singles
Political party songs
Tagalog-language songs
Filipino language songs
2020s ballads